Richard Z. Johnson (May 21, 1837 – September 1913) was an American attorney and politician who served as the attorney general of the Idaho Territory from 1885 to 1890.

Early life and education 
Johnson was born in Akron, Ohio in 1837 to parents from Vermont. He earned a Bachelor of Laws from Yale Law School after attending the United States Military Academy.

Career 

After graduating from law school, Johnson operated a private legal practice in Winona, Minnesota for five years. Johnson then lived in Nevada before settling in Ruby City, Idaho. Johnson established another legal practice with partner William H. Davenport before the two dissolved their partnership. Johnson worked as a lawyer in Silver City and Ada County, Idaho before relocating to Boise. Johnson was a member of the Boise City Council and Idaho Territorial Council before being elected Idaho Territorial Attorney General, serving from 1885 to 1890. Johnson later worked to establish the Boise School District and was the president of the Idaho State Bar.

Personal life 
Johnson died in 1913 while on a trip to Lindau, Bavaria, Germany with his wife.

References 

1837 births
1913 deaths
Idaho Attorneys General
People from Akron, Ohio
Yale Law School alumni
Yale University alumni
People from Winona, Minnesota
People from Owyhee County, Idaho
People from Ada County, Idaho
People from Boise, Idaho
Idaho lawyers